The 2017 Rallye Açores was 1st round of 2017 European Rally Championship, it was won by local driver Bruno Magalhães with Škoda Fabia R5.

Results

Special stages

References
Final results on ewrc-results.com

Açores
Rallye Açores
Rallye Açores